Zhuhai Changlong railway station is a railway station of the Zhuhai–Zhuhai Airport intercity railway. It is the southern terminus of the first phase of the line, which started operations on 18 August 2020.

The railway station serves the Chimelong Ocean Kingdom of Chimelong International Ocean Tourist Resort. It is operated by China Railway Guangzhou Group.

References

Railway stations in Guangdong
Zhuhai
Railway stations in China opened in 2020